Ghassan bin Abdurrahman Al-Shibl (Arabic: غسان بن عبدالرحمن الشبل)  is a Saudi engineer, born in 1959, and the chairman of the board of directors of the Local Content and Government Procurement Commission appointed by King Salman on December 27, 2018. Al-shibl is also a member of Council of Economic and Development Affairs.

Education 

 B.S.c in Civil Engineering from King Saud University, 1982.
 M.S. in Engineering Management George Washington University, USA in 1986.
 Ph.D. degree in Engineering Management George Washington University, USA in 1990.

Career 

 Teaching Assistant at the university (1982 - 1983). 
 Served as the director of the follow-up department, General Administration of Projects, Ministry of Interior (1983 - 1990).
 The founder of the Boroz Advanced Technology. 
 Joined Advanced Electronics Company (AEC) in 1990 as vice president, chief operating officer, then became executive vice president in 1994.
 Chairman of Saudi Research and Marketing Group (SRMG), 2018.
 Chief Executive Officer, Managing Director at SRMG (2017-2018).
 Chairman of the Board at Saudi Arabian Airlines Corporation since (2017-2018).

References 

1959 births
Arab engineers
King Saud University alumni
George Washington University School of Engineering and Applied Science alumni
Living people